Animation music is original music written specifically to accompany an animation.

History 
One of the first American animation songs is "Minnie's Yoo Hoo" (1930). In Japan, anime music has reached the top 10 of the weekly Oricon Singles Chart.

Notable composers 
 Carl Stalling
 Scott Bradley
 Winston Sharples
 Joe Hisaishi
 Yoko Kanno
 Alf Clausen
 Mark Mothersbaugh
 Richard Stone

Notable films and shows with animation music 
Looney Tunes
Tom and Jerry
The Simpsons
Rugrats
Animaniacs
Silly Symphonies

See also
Anime composer
Anime music
Anime music video
Mickey Mousing
Production music

References

 
Anime music
Film music
Film and video terminology
History of animation